Bellinge is a village and parish in Denmark.  It is situated southwest of Odense, and is a suburb of the city.  As of 1 January 2022 the village has a population of 5,483.

It is known for its church, Bellinge Kirke, with murals dating from 1496.

Notable people 
 Hans Jacob Hansen (1855 in Bellinge – 1936 in Gentofte) a Danish zoologist

References

Suburbs of Odense
Populated places in Funen
Odense Municipality